Blood Punch is a 2013 horror thriller film directed by Madellaine Paxson in her directorial debut, and starring Milo Cawthorne, Olivia Tennet, Ari Boyland. and Adelaide Kane. The film had its world premiere on 26 October 2013 at the Austin Film Festival, where it won the Dark Matters Audience Award. The film had a positive critical reception.

Synopsis
When Milton (Milo Cawthorne) is caught cooking meth, he is sent to a rehab center where he meets the beautiful Skyler (Olivia Tennet). He is wildly attracted to her, so much so that they have sex shortly after meeting. Milton also agrees to break out of rehab with her and travel to the woods, where he will make a large amount of meth for an exorbitant sum of money. He is ill-prepared for her psychotic boyfriend Russell (Ari Boyland), who tells him that he knows about Milton's fling with Skyler. Unbeknownst to Milton, the cabin is set in the middle of a land that has been forever psychically tainted by a massive and bloody Native American war.

Cast
Milo Cawthorne as Milton
Olivia Tennet as Skyler
Ari Boyland as Russell
Fleur Saville as Claire
Adelaide Kane as Nabiki
Mike Ginn as Riley

Production
Screenwriter Eddie Guzelian came up with the idea for the film from an incident where he left a note for himself one night, only to later find another note he had left for himself the night before that he had no memory of writing. Milo Cawthorne freely admits to the story's resemblance to Memento.

The film in many ways serves as a reunion of cast and crew for the 2009 series Power Rangers RPM: the film was scripted by Eddie Guzelian, the head writer and executive producer for said-show; Cawthorne, Tennet, Boyland, Kane, Ginn, and producer McIver previously co-starred on RPM; and director Paxson was a writer on RPM.

Reception
Critical and viewer reception for Blood Punch was positive. The Austin Chronicle and Bloody Disgusting both praised the film, and Bloody Disgusting favorably compared it to the 1948 film Road House.

Awards
Dark Matters Audience Award at the Austin Film Festival (2013, won)
Audience Award for Fusion Features at Dances With Films (2014, won)
Audience Award for Run of Fest Features at Dances With Films (2014, won)
Festival Award for Best Feature Film at the Hoboken International Film Festival (2014, won)
Festival Award for Best Director at the Hoboken International Film Festival  (2014, won - Madellaine Paxson)
Festival Award for Best Cinematography at the Hoboken International Film Festival  (2014, won - Neil Cervin)
Jury Award for Best Feature Film at the New Orleans Horror Film Festival (2014, won)
Jury Award for Best OFF THE EDGE Feature at the Omaha Film Festival (2014, won)

References

External links
 
 
 

2013 films
2013 horror films
2013 directorial debut films
Time loop films
2010s English-language films